Albion Williamson Knight (August 24, 1859 - June 9, 1936) was a bishop in the Episcopal Church, serving in Cuba and the Episcopal Diocese of New Jersey.

History
He was born in White Springs, Florida and educated at the University of the South. Following ministry in parishes in Georgia and Florida, he was consecrated in 1904 for missionary work in Cuba. He resigned this jurisdiction in 1913 to serve as Bishop Coadjutor of New Jersey, retiring in 1935.

He was the son of George Augustine Knight (1830-1877), a merchant, and his wife Martha née Demere (1824-1862). He married first Elise Nichol Hallowes (1853-1918) and had a daughter Ada Nicoll Knight (1893- ) and a son Albion Williamson Knight (1891-1953); his second marriage was to Miriam Yates, née Powell (1879-1958).

His grandson, Brigadier General Albion W. Knight, Jr. (1924-2012), also became a minister in the Episcopal Church, before joining the United Episcopal Church of North America and becoming its presiding bishop.

References
Obituary in The Living Church, June 20, 1936, p. 799.

1859 births
1936 deaths
People from Hamilton County, Florida
Sewanee: The University of the South alumni
American expatriates in Cuba
American expatriate bishops
Episcopal bishops of Cuba
Episcopal bishops of New Jersey